Souleymane Karamoko (born 29 July 1992) is a professional footballer who plays as a defender. Born in France, he plays for the Mauritania national team.

Career
Karamoko made his professional debut with Paris FC in a Ligue 2 2–1 win over Bourg-en-Bresse on 4 August 2017.

International career
Born in France, Karamoko is of Mauritanian descent. He was called up to represent the Mauritania national team for the 2021 Africa Cup of Nations. He debuted with the Mauritania national team in a 0–0 friendly tie with Burkina Faso on 30 December 2021.

References

External links
 
 
 

1992 births
Living people
Footballers from Paris
Citizens of Mauritania through descent
Mauritanian footballers
Mauritania international footballers
French footballers
French sportspeople of Mauritanian descent
Association football defenders
Racing 92 players
Entente SSG players
Paris FC players
AS Nancy Lorraine players
Ligue 2 players
Championnat National 2 players
Championnat National 3 players
2021 Africa Cup of Nations players